Claude Feige (born 24 June 1958) is a French curler.

He participated in the demonstration curling events at the 1992 Winter Olympics, where the French men's team finished in sixth place.

At the national level, he is a two-time French men's champion curler.

Teams

References

External links

 Video: 

Living people
1958 births
French male curlers
French curling champions
Curlers at the 1992 Winter Olympics
Olympic curlers of France